Tõnu Õnnepalu (born 13 September 1962), also known by the pen names Emil Tode and Anton Nigov, is an Estonian poet, author and translator.

Õnnepalu was born in Tallinn and studied biology at the University of Tartu from 1980 to 1985. He began his writing career as a poet in 1985 and has published three collections of his works. In 1993 he  garnered international attention when his novel Piiririik (English translation: "Border State") was published under his pen name 'Emil Tode'. The book was translated into 14 languages and became the most translated Estonian book of the 1990s. In 1994 he was awarded the Baltic Assembly Prize for Literature. Õnnepalu's work often explores topics such as homosexuality, isolation and  betrayal.

In 1992, his poem "Inquiétude du Fini" was performed as a choral piece, with notable Estonian composer Erkki-Sven Tüür acting as conductor.
      
In addition to writing novels, Tõnu Õnnepalu has translated works into Estonian from the French language by such authors as François Mauriac, Charles Baudelaire and Marcel Proust and has written for such English language publications as the Poetry Society. Tõnu Õnnepalu is also a member of the Board of Governors of the Eesti Maaülikool (Estonian University of Life Sciences) in Tartu.

Novels
Piiririik ("Border State", as Emil Tode)
Published by Tuum, 1993.
Hind ("The Price", as Emil Tode)
Published by Tuum, 1995.
Mõõt ("The Measure", as Emil Tode)
Published by Tuum, 1996.
Printsess ("Princess", as Emil Tode)
Published by Täht, 1997.
Harjutused ("Practicing", as Anton Nigov)
Published by Eesti Keele Sihtasutus, 2002.
Raadio ("Radio", as Emil Tode)
Published by Eesti Keele Sihtasutus, 2002.
English translation, Radio, published by Dalkey Archive Press, 2014
Paradiis ("Paradise", as Tõnu Õnnepalu)
Published by Varrak, 2009.
Mandala ("Mandala", as Tõnu Õnnepalu)
Published by Varrak, 2012.
Valede kataloog. Inglise aed 
Published by Eesti Keele Sihtasutus, 2017.
Lõpmatus (Infinity, as Tõnu Õnnepalu)
 Published by EKSA, 2019.

Collections of poetry
Jõeäärne maja, 1985
Ithaka, 1988
Sel maal, 1990
Mõõt, 1996
Enne heinaaega ja hiljem, 2005
Kevad ja suvi ja, 2009
Kuidas on elada, 2012
 Klaasveranda, 2016
 Pimeduse tunnel, 2020

References

External links
Estonian Literature Information Center
Eesti Maaülikool: Estonian University of Life Sciences
Estonian Culture: Literature

1962 births
Living people
Writers from Tallinn
Estonian male novelists
Estonian male poets
Estonian translators
University of Tartu alumni
20th-century Estonian novelists
20th-century Estonian poets
21st-century Estonian novelists
21st-century Estonian poets
Recipients of the Order of the White Star, 5th Class